Callia bicolor is a species of beetle in the family Cerambycidae. It was described by Breuning in 1960. It is known from French Guiana.

References

Calliini
Beetles described in 1960